Thalheim is a town in the district Erzgebirgskreis, in the Free State of Saxony, Germany. It is situated 5 km east of Stollberg, and 16 km south of Chemnitz.

References 

Erzgebirgskreis